Eulima germana is a species of sea snail, a marine gastropod mollusk in the family Eulimidae. The species is one of a number within the genus Eulima. As the name suggests, this species is mainly distributed off the coasts of Germany and minor German Exclusive Economic Zones.

References

External links
 To World Register of Marine Species 

germana
Gastropods described in 1890